Fissarena is a genus of spiders in the family Trachycosmidae. It was first described in 1995 by Henschel, Davies & Dickman. , it contains 9 Australian species.

Species

Fissarena comprises the following species:
Fissarena arcoona Platnick, 2002
Fissarena barlee Platnick, 2002
Fissarena barrow Platnick, 2002
Fissarena castanea (Simon, 1908)
Fissarena cuny Platnick, 2002
Fissarena ethabuka Henschel, Davies & Dickman, 1995
Fissarena laverton Platnick, 2002
Fissarena longipes (Hogg, 1896)
Fissarena woodleigh Platnick, 2002

References

Trochanteriidae
Araneomorphae genera
Spiders of Australia